John Young (1827 – 27 February 1907) was an Australian bowler, builder, politician and alderman.

Life and career
Young was born in Foot's Cray, Kent, England and died in Annandale, Sydney, New South Wales. After moving to Victoria, Australia, in 1855, he had mixed results as a builder. He then moved to Sydney in 1866 and proceeded to make his mark. As a result, he is especially remembered as the builder of St Mary's Cathedral in Sydney (designed by William Wardell), and the Johnston Street group of houses in Annandale. The most outstanding house in the group was The Abbey, a sandstone, heritage-listed house in the Victorian Free Gothic style. (Sydney folklore has it that Young took gargoyles intended for St Mary's Cathedral and used them on The Abbey). Another outstanding house was Highroyd. The house known as Oybin is also heritage-listed.

The Johnston Street group originally consisted of eight houses, two of which (Rozelle and Claremont) have since been demolished and replaced with blocks of home units. Young himself lived in the nearby house known as Kentville, which has also been demolished.

Young also took an active interest in politics, unsuccessfully standing for a seat in the Legislative Assembly on five occasions, 1873 (Glebe), 1874 (East Sydney), 1880 (Newtown), 1887 (Hartley), and 1894 (Annandale). He was mayor of Leichhardt in 1879 and 1884–85, mayor of Sydney in 1885–86,  and mayor of Annandale in 1894–97.

Young died of cancer at Kentville in 1907.

John Young Crescent in the Canberra suburb of Greenway is named in his honour.

References

 

Politicians from Sydney
Australian Anglicans
English emigrants to colonial Australia
1827 births
1907 deaths
19th-century Australian politicians
Mayors of Leichhardt
Mayors of Annandale
Mayors and Lord Mayors of Sydney
Sport Australia Hall of Fame inductees